Dechen Zangmo is a Bhutanese politician who has been a Bhutan Peace and Prosperity Party (DPT) member of the National Assembly of Bhutan 2013 to 2018.

References

Year of birth missing (living people)
Living people
Bhutanese MNAs 2013–2018
21st-century Bhutanese politicians
Druk Phuensum Tshogpa politicians
Bhutanese politicians
Druk Phuensum Tshogpa MNAs